The Rai Coast languages are a family of languages in the Madang stock of New Guinea.

Sidney Herbert Ray identified what was then known of the Rai Coast languages as a unit in 1919. They were linked with the Mabuso languages in 1951 by Arthur Capell in his Madang family.

Languages
Though the validity of Rai Coast is well established, there are ongoing adjustments to membership and internal classification. Malcolm Ross added two languages to Rai Coast, Tauya and Biyom, from the small erstwhile Brahman branch of Madang.

The languages are as follows,

 Rai Coast 
 Pulabu
Evapia–Kabenau
 Evapia River
Kow
Kesawai, Sausi
Kolom (Migum), Siroi
West Kabenau River: Arawum–Lemio, Dumpu
Brahman – Peka River
Brahman: Biyom, Tauya
Peka River
North: Sumau, Sop (Usino)
South: Danaru, Kobuga (= Urigina?) 
 Nuru River
Uya (Usu)
Kwato (Waube)
Lower Nuru River: Ogea (Erima), Uyaji–Amowe
Awung–Guabe Rivers
Awung River: Jilim, Among (= Rerau?)
Yangulam

Ross (2000, 2005) reconstructs pronouns for proto-Sub-Rai, which is more-or-less synonymous with Rai Coast as a whole, proto-Mindjim, proto-Yaganon, and proto-Kow–Usino.

References

Bibliography

Ross, Malcolm. 2014. Proto-Rai-Coast. TransNewGuinea.org.
Ross, Malcolm. 2014. Proto-Sub-Rai. TransNewGuinea.org.
Z'graggen, J.A. A comparative word list of the Rai Coast languages, Madang Province, Papua New Guinea. D-30, xvi + 196 pages. Pacific Linguistics, The Australian National University, 1980. 

 
Languages of Papua New Guinea
Central Madang languages